Zhang Enjian (born 12 December 1987 in Tianjin) is a Chinese swimmer, who competed for Team China at the 2008 and 2012 Summer Olympics.

Major achievements
2006 Asian Games – 2nd 4 × 200 m freestyle relay;
2007 Japan Open – 2nd 200m freestyle;
2007 National Intercity Games – 1st 200m freestyle;
2008 National Champions Tournament – 1st 100m freestyle

References

http://2008teamchina.olympic.cn/index.php/personview/personsen/811

External links
 

1987 births
Living people
Chinese male freestyle swimmers
Olympic swimmers of China
Swimmers at the 2008 Summer Olympics
Swimmers at the 2012 Summer Olympics
Asian Games medalists in swimming
Asian Games gold medalists for China
Asian Games silver medalists for China
Swimmers at the 2006 Asian Games
Swimmers at the 2010 Asian Games
Medalists at the 2006 Asian Games
Medalists at the 2010 Asian Games
World Games gold medalists
Swimmers from Tianjin
Competitors at the 2009 World Games
Chinese lifesaving athletes
21st-century Chinese people